Citrus County is a county located on the west central coast of the U.S. state of Florida. As of the 2020 census, the population was 153,843. Its county seat is Inverness, and its largest community is Homosassa Springs.

Citrus County comprises the Homosassa Springs, Florida Metropolitan Statistical Area.

History
The area covered by present-day Citrus County is thought to have been first occupied at least 10,000 years ago. About 2,500 years ago, mound-building Native Americans settled in the area and built the complex that now forms the Crystal River Archeological Site. The site was occupied for about 2,000 years. Why the complex was abandoned is currently unknown.

Citrus County was created in 1887. The Citrus County area was formerly part of Hernando County. It was named for the county's citrus groves. Citrus production declined dramatically after the "Big Freeze" of 1894-1895: today, citrus is grown on one large grove, Bellamy Grove; additionally, some residents have citrus trees on their personal property.

After the Big Freeze the next major industry was phosphate mining, which continued until World War I. Planned industrial development surrounding the construction of the Cross Florida Barge Canal never came to fruition when the partially-built canal was terminated after environmental opposition. A later attempt to create a port (Port Citrus) from the portion of the canal that was completed resulted in no significant progress and the county voted in 2015 to scuttle the project.

The original Citrus County seat was Mannfield (incorrectly spelled Mansfield or Mannsfeld in some sources). The county seat was later moved to Inverness; only a street and a pond remain of the original county seat town.

The first library in Citrus County was founded in 1917 in Inverness. Other branches opened in Floral City in 1958, and Hernando in 1959, as well as the freestanding Crystal River and Homosassa Libraries. These libraries joined to create the Central Florida Library System in 1961. Beverly Hills Library opened in 1970 and joined the Central Florida Library System. A Special Library Taxing District was created by the voters in March 1984. In October 1987, the Citrus County Library System was established which allowed the county residents to administer their own system.

Geography

There are a number of uninhabited and/or sparsely inhabited coastal islands that can be accessed via watercraft. While some of the Citrus County islands are state lands thus available for public use for recreational opportunities, many other Citrus County islands are private property and are either wholly or partially owned by private parties.

Adjacent counties
 Levy County - northwest
 Marion County - northeast
 Sumter County - east
 Hernando County - south

National protected areas
 Chassahowitzka National Wildlife Refuge (part)
 Crystal River National Wildlife Refuge

Fauna
According to the US Fish and Wildlife Services' aerial manatee surveys, as many as 400 of these unique creatures can be found in Citrus County at one time. This typically occurs only during the coldest months of the year.

Manatees can also be viewed in the underwater observatory at Homosassa Springs Wildlife State Park. Most of the park's residents are injured animals either undergoing rehabilitation for future release to the wild, or will be permanent due to their inability to be released to the wild. The notable exception is Lucifer, an African hippopotamus that had prior movie roles. When a permanent home could not be found for Lucifer, then-Governor Lawton Chiles named him an "honorary citizen of the state" thus allowing him to remain at the Park.

Demographics

As of the 2020 United States census, there were 153,843 people, 64,621 households, and 40,063 families residing in the county.

As of the census of 2000, 118,085 people, 52,634 households, and 36,317 families resided in the county. The 62,204 housing units averaged . The racial makeup of the county was 95.05% White, 2.36% Black or African American, 0.36% Native American, 0.76% Asian, 0.03% Pacific Islander, 0.37% from other races, and 1.07% from two or more races. About 2.66% of the population were Hispanics or Latinos of any race.

Of the 52,634 households, 19% had children under the age of 18 living with them, 58.30% were married couples living together, 7.60% had a female householder with no husband present, and 31% were not families. About 26.10% of all households were made up of individuals, and 15.60% had someone living alone who was 65 years of age or older. The average household size was 2.20 and the average family size was 2.60.

In the county, the population was distributed as 17.20% under the age of 18, 4.60% from 18 to 24, 19.10% from 25 to 44, 26.90% from 45 to 64, and 32.20% who were 65 years of age or older. The median age was 53 years. For every 100 females, there were 92.30 males. For every 100 females age 18 and over, there were 89.60 males.

Economy

Personal income
The median income for a household in the county was $31,001, and for a family was $36,711. Males had a median income of $28,091 versus $21,408 for females. The per capita income for the county was $18,585. Around 11.70% of the population and 8.50% of families were below the poverty line; 18.10% of those under the age of 18 and 7.00% of those 65 and older were living below the poverty line.

Labor
More than one-third of residents were senior citizens in 2014. Health care dominates the work force.

Transportation

Airports
 Citrus County is served by two local airports, Crystal River Airport and Inverness Airport.

Railroads
One rail line operates within the county: A freight line to the Crystal River Energy Complex in northern Citrus County. Other lines that used to run through Citrus were either converted into rail trails such as the Cross Town Trail in Crystal River and Withlacoochee State Trail in eastern Citrus County or abandoned.

Major roads

  State Road 589 runs north to south due to the recent expansion of the Suncoast Parkway from Hernando County.
  U.S. Route 19 is the main local road through western Citrus County, running south to north.
  U.S. Route 41 is the main local road through eastern Citrus County, running south to north. North of CR 48 in Floral City, the road is also shared by the DeSoto Trail.
  U.S. Route 98 runs northwest to southeast from Hernando County, Florida, and joins US 19 in Chassahowitzka on its way to Perry.
  State Road 44 runs east and west through the northern part of the county from Crystal River into Sumter County. A county extension south of the western terminus runs into Fort Island.
  County Road 48 runs mostly east and west through Southeastern Citrus County. It spans from US 41 Floral City winding southeast along the Withlacoochee River, which it eventually crosses on the way to Bushnell and Center Hill in Sumter County, and Howey-in-the Hills in Lake County. The segment in Bushnell between I-75(Exit 314) and US 301 becomes a state road. Throughout Citrus County, County Road 48 is also shared by the DeSoto Trail.
  County Road 480 is the southernmost county road in Citrus County. It runs east and west from Chassahowitzka with a short concurrency with US 98, then through the Withlacoochee State Forest where it eventually terminates at US 41 in Floral City, south of CR 48.
  County Road 490 runs east and west from the Gulf of Mexico along the south side of the Homosassa River until it briefly joins US 19-98 in downtown Homosassa Springs only to head northeast towards SR 44 in Lecanto.
  County Road 491: A Bi-County road that begins in unincorporated northwestern Hernando County, then runs north and south along the western side of the Withlacoochee State Forest, and into Lecanto and Beverly Hills where it curves east in northern Citrus County and crosses US 41 in Holder, only to terminate at SR 200 near the Citrus-Marion County Line.
  County Road 581: Runs north and south along the eastern side of the Withlacoochee State Forest from County Road 481 in Lake Lindsey, into Inverness where it joins SR 44 east towards US 41, only to branch off on its own as a dead end street on the banks of the Withlacoochee River.

Communities

Cities
 Crystal River
 Inverness

Census-designated places

 Beverly Hills
 Black Diamond
 Citrus Hills
 Citrus Springs
 Floral City
 Hernando
 Homosassa
 Homosassa Springs
 Inverness Highlands North
 Inverness Highlands South
 Lecanto
 Pine Ridge
 Sugarmill Woods

Other unincorporated communities

 Chassahowitzka
 Holder
 Meadowcrest
 Pineola
 Red Level

Former towns
 Mannfield (original county seat, now a ghost town)
 Orleans
 Stage Pond (Cemetery still remains)
 Arlington
 Fairmount (town site is now Meadowcrest Industrial Park)

Government

Libraries
Originally, the libraries within Citrus County were separate and overseen by different local organizations. In 1961, the libraries of Crystal River, Floral City, Hernando, Homosassa, and Inverness joined the Central Florida Regional Library System along with Levy and Marion Counties. The Citrus County Library System was established on October 1, 1987.

The Citrus County Library System offers a PAWS to Read program where elementary school-aged children can enhance their literacy skills by reading aloud to a certified therapy dog. It also has several other children/teen programs and adult recreational classes.

On October 24, 2019, the Citrus County Commissioners voted against the Library System's request for funding to give library users digital access to the New York Times. Commissioner Scott Carnahan said, "I don't want the New York Times in this county. I don't agree with it, I don't like 'em, it's fake news and I'm voting no. They can take that money and do something else with it ... I support Donald Trump."

There are five branches of the Citrus County Library System:
 Beverly Hills (Central Ridge)
The library in Beverly Hills began as a few shelves in the Beverly Hills recreational hall. A proper library was made possible by the local residents. In 1965, those that wished to expand the library visited homes asking for donations of $1 from each. The new library was built and its materials relocated to a building on Beverly Hills Boulevard. In 1969, the library moved slightly south to inhabit part of the Fire House. Nine years later, when the Fire House was moved, the library expanded to use the entire space. The Beverly Hills Library became the Central Ridge Branch on Roosevelt Boulevard during its dedication in 1995.
 Crystal River (Coastal Region)
On April 8, 1959, the first public library opened in Crystal River at 639 Citrus Ave. Much of the funding for this building was donated by the Crystal River Women's Club. A year later, the library moved into the old post office space. After the libraries joined the Central Florida Regional Library System, the City of Crystal River donated two lots of land for the building of a new library. The building was later expanded in 1972, which remained until 1983 when the current library was built at 8619 W Crystal St. The library was then renamed to The Coastal Region Library.
 Floral City
The Floral City Public Library branch is located in the town center of Floral City. Oak trees lead up to the library. Surrounding the library is the Floral City Heritage Museum and Country Store, the Floral City Masonic Lodge, and Community House. The library is managed by the Citrus County Board of County Commissioners (BOCC) and receives governmental funding and donations to operate. The Lion's Club started the library in 1958 in a former gift shop.
A new branch location was built and opened on May 1, 2009. The building was part of a $1.5 million town center and linear park on Orange Avenue and replaced the old facility. The branch offers adult literacy, early childhood literacy, family & youth, self enrichment, and technology education classes. The library has many craft class offerings for children, teens, adults, and seniors. Popular programs include adult coloring, tissue paper flowers, recycled book art, and card making. Close to holidays, the branch hosts themed activities and small parties for children. Staff of the Floral City branch create monthly book displays to entice patrons to new areas and titles. Every year the library hosts two book sales (spring and fall) to raise funds for more materials and programs. Staff participates in Heritage Days which is a weekend-long celebration of the founding of Floral City. Heritage days take place in early December and staff members dress up in garb from the late 1800s.
 Homosassa
 Inverness (Lakes Region)

Elections

Voter registration
According to the Secretary of State's office, Republicans comprise a plurality of registered voters in Citrus County.

Federal and state offices
Citrus County has voted Republican in national elections since 2000 and has voted Republican in state and local races before the 21st century. As of 2015, Republicans held the federal representative, state senator, and state representative seats serving the county, occupied all seats on the Citrus County Commission, and held nearly all other separately elected offices in the county. In 2016 the county broke heavily for Donald Trump, giving him 67% of the vote, the largest of any candidate since President Nixon in 1972.

The County has been trending heavily Republican for the past few decades, with Democratic registration actually declining for at least the past 15 years.

Media
The Citrus County newspaper of record is the Citrus County Chronicle, a daily. It is published by Landmark Media Enterprises. A second paper, The Newscaster, also circulates in Citrus County but is located in neighboring Marion County.

Other online news sources include the Groundhog News, Citrus Daily, Real News Real Fast, Sunshine Standard and Citrus Times Online.

The local TV station is WYKE-CD.

The county is part of the Nielsen-designated Tampa-Saint Petersburg-Sarasota television market. Spectrum and Comcast serve different areas of Citrus County, with Spectrum serving the western part of the county, including Crystal River; and Comcast serving Inverness, and the eastern county communities; these systems offer most Tampa Bay stations, plus selected channels from the Orlando and Gainesville markets.

Radio stations in Citrus County are part of the Arbitron-designated Gainesville/Ocala radio market.

See also

 Citrus County School District
 National Register of Historic Places listings in Citrus County, Florida
 Fort Island Gulf Beach

Notes

References

External links

 
 Citrus County Chamber of Commerce
 Citrus County Visitors and Convention Bureau

 
1887 establishments in Florida
Counties in the Tampa Bay area
Florida counties
Populated places established in 1887